"(God Must Have Spent) A Little More Time on You" is a song by American boy band NSYNC. It was released as the third single from their self-titled debut album in the U.S. While some of the previous singles were released in Europe, this one was not, and subsequently only charted in Australia and the U.S., reaching number 46 and number 8 respectively. The single included a live version of Christopher Cross song "Sailing", as well as a limited edition postcard. Some versions of the single included the track's video. The radio version of this song was featured on both their first and third compilation albums: Greatest Hits (2005) and The Essential *NSYNC (2014).

Track listings
America (1999)
Version 1
 "God Must Have Spent a Little More Time on You" (Remix)
 "Sailing" (Live Version)
 "God Must Have Spent a Little More Time on You" (Video)
 "Interview" (Video)

Version 2
 "(God Must Have Spent) A Little More Time on You" (Single Version)
 "Sad Lookin' Moon"

Music video
The video was directed by Lionel C. Martin. The video shows the band performing around one single microphone, while showing footage of the mother and son, from birth to old age, including childhood memories, going to war, and coming home. All the footage of the mother and son was in black and white, whereas most of the footage of *NSYNC is in full color.

Charts

Weekly charts

Year-end charts

Release history

Alabama version

In 1999, country music band Alabama recorded the song with a backing vocal from NSYNC, and released it as a single from their eighteenth studio album, Twentieth Century. This version peaked at number three on the Billboard Hot Country Songs chart and at number 29 on the Billboard Hot 100. The song is the only Hot Country Songs chart entry for NSYNC. This was also Alabama's final top 10 hit on the Billboard Country charts. The song was later included as the B-side to Alabama's next single, "Small Stuff."

Weekly charts

Year-end charts

References

External links

1998 singles
1999 singles
1998 songs
Alabama (American band) songs
Music videos directed by Lionel C. Martin
NSYNC songs
Pop ballads
RCA Records singles
Song recordings produced by Don Cook
Songs written by Carl Sturken and Evan Rogers
1990s ballads
Contemporary R&B ballads
Black-and-white music videos
Vocal collaborations